Catocala connubialis, the connubial underwing, is a moth of the family Erebidae. The species was first described by Achille Guenée in 1852. It is found in North America from Ontario to Prince Edward Island (including Quebec, New Brunswick, and Nova Scotia), south to Florida and west to Texas, Oklahoma, and Missouri.

The wingspan is 37–47 mm. Adults are on wing from June to September depending on the location. There is probably one generation per year.

The larvae feed on Cephalanthus occidentalis, Melia azedarach, and Quercus rubra.

References

External links
Species info

Moths described in 1852
connubialis
Moths of North America